The Jeffrey Manufacturing Company Office Building is a historic building in the Italian Village neighborhood of Columbus, Ohio. It was listed on the National Register of Historic Places in 2001 and the Columbus Register of Historic Properties in 2015.

See also
 National Register of Historic Places listings in Columbus, Ohio

References

External links
 

Commercial buildings on the National Register of Historic Places in Ohio
Commercial buildings completed in 1924
National Register of Historic Places in Columbus, Ohio
Columbus Register properties
Buildings and structures in Columbus, Ohio
Historic district contributing properties in Columbus, Ohio
Italian Village